The Presbyterian Church in Korea (DaeShin II) was formed in 1972 when Rev Kim Chi-Sun separated from the Presbyterian Church in Korea (Daeshin). They founded another DaeShin Seminary which was to become a College in 1980. The denomination developed around the college. The Apostles Creed and Westminster Confession are the standards. In 2004 it had 15,200 members and 125 congregations and 155 ordained clergy. It had 9 Presbyteries and a General assembly. Official language is the Korean.

References 

Presbyterian denominations in South Korea
Presbyterian denominations in Asia